Hippolyte Ferrat (1822–1882) was a French sculptor from Aix-en-Provence. He specialised in busts. He designed public sculptures in Provence as well as busts for private collections and city halls. His work can be found in museums in Europe and the United States.

Early life
Hippolyte Ferrat was born on August 9, 1822 in Aix-en-Provence, France.

He was educated at the École nationale supérieure des Beaux-Arts in Paris, where James Pradier was one of his professors.

Career
Ferrat designed public sculptures in his hometown of Aix-en-Provence and in nearby Marseille. He designed one of the sculptures at the top of the Fontaine de la Rotonde in 1860. He also designed a bust of François Granet, a painter from Aix, at the top of the Fontaine Bellegarde. Meanwhile, he designed caryatids and the pediment on the Hôtel Louvre et Paix in Marseille.

Ferrat designed many busts for private collections and city halls. His sculpture entitled 'Le Prince impérial' is exhibited at the Château de Compiègne. In 1849, he designed The Fall of Icarus, which is now exhibited at the Philadelphia Museum of Art. Moreover, he designed a bust of Hippolyte Fortoul, a politician, in 1857. It was given to the city of Digne in 1868, and it is still in their collection to this day. In 1858, he designed a statue of François Denis Tronchet, another politician. It was given to the city of Lisieux in 1935, and it is still in their collection.

Death
He died on October 24, 1882 in Aix-en-Provence. He was buried at the Saint-Pierre Cemetery in Aix.

Legacy
The Salle Hippolyte Ferrat in Le Tholonet near Aix-en-Provence is named in his honour.

Gallery

References

External links
 

1822 births
1882 deaths
Artists from Aix-en-Provence
École des Beaux-Arts alumni
19th-century French sculptors
French male sculptors
19th-century French male artists